The following outline is provided as an overview of and topical guide to Azerbaijan:

Azerbaijan – largest country in the Caucasus region of Eurasia, bordering the Caspian Sea and possessing a rich fossil fuels industry. Azerbaijan is a progressive and secular predominantly Shia Islamic society, with a high tolerance for other religions.

General reference 

 Common English country name:  Azerbaijan
 Official English country name:  The Republic of Azerbaijan
 Common endonym(s):  
 Official endonym(s):  
 Adjectival(s): Azerbaijani, Azeri
 Demonym(s):
 Etymology: Name of Azerbaijan
 International rankings of Azerbaijan
 ISO country codes: AZ, AZE, 031
 ISO region codes: See ISO 3166-2:AZ
 Internet country code top-level domain: .az

Geography of Azerbaijan 

Geography of Azerbaijan
 Azerbaijan is: a landlocked country (though it has a coast on the non-freshwater lake, the Caspian Sea)
 Location:
 Eurasia
 Asia
 Western Asia
 Caucasus (between Europe and Asia)
 South Caucasus
 Time zone:  Azerbaijan Time (UTC+04)
 Extreme points of Azerbaijan
 High:  Bazarduzu Dagi 
 Low:  Caspian Sea 
 Land boundaries:  2,013 km
 787 km
 611 km
 322 km
 284 km
 9 km
 Coastline:  none
 Population of Azerbaijan: 9,165,000(2011) - 99th most populous country

 Area of Azerbaijan:  - 113th largest country
 Atlas of Azerbaijan

Environment of Azerbaijan 

Environment of Azerbaijan
 Climate of Azerbaijan
 Environmental issues in Azerbaijan
 Renewable energy in Azerbaijan
 Geology of Azerbaijan
 Protected areas of Azerbaijan
 Biosphere reserves in Azerbaijan
 National parks of Azerbaijan
 Wildlife of Azerbaijan
 Flora of Azerbaijan
 Fauna of Azerbaijan
 Birds of Azerbaijan
 Mammals of Azerbaijan

Natural geographic features of Azerbaijan 

 Glaciers of Azerbaijan
 Islands of Azerbaijan
 Lakes of Azerbaijan
 Mountains of Azerbaijan
 Volcanoes in Azerbaijan
 Rivers of Azerbaijan
 Waterfalls of Azerbaijan
 Valleys of Azerbaijan
 World Heritage Sites in Azerbaijan

Regions of Azerbaijan 

Regions of Azerbaijan

Ecoregions of Azerbaijan 

List of ecoregions in Azerbaijan

Administrative divisions of Azerbaijan 

Administrative divisions of Azerbaijan
 Nakhchivan Autonomous Republic
 Districts of Azerbaijan
 Municipalities of Azerbaijan

Districts of Azerbaijan 

Districts of Azerbaijan
There are 59 districts in Azerbaijan and 8 districts in the Autonomous Republic:

Municipalities of Azerbaijan 

Municipalities of Azerbaijan
 Capital of Azerbaijan: Baku
 Cities of Azerbaijan

Demography of Azerbaijan 

Demographics of Azerbaijan

Government and politics of Azerbaijan 

Politics of Azerbaijan
 Form of government: unitary semi-presidential republic
 Capital of Azerbaijan: Baku
 Elections in Azerbaijan
 Political parties in Azerbaijan
 Taxation in Azerbaijan

Branches of government 

Government of Azerbaijan

Executive branch of the government of Azerbaijan 
 Head of state: President of Azerbaijan,
 Head of government: Prime Minister of Azerbaijan,
 Cabinet of Azerbaijan

Legislative branch of the government of Azerbaijan 

 Parliament of Azerbaijan (bicameral)
 Upper house: Senate of Azerbaijan
 Lower house: House of Commons of Azerbaijan

Judicial branch of the government of Azerbaijan 

Judiciary of Azerbaijan

 Supreme Court of Azerbaijan

Foreign relations of Azerbaijan 

Foreign relations of Azerbaijan
 Diplomatic missions in Azerbaijan
 Diplomatic missions of Azerbaijan

International organization membership 
The Republic of Azerbaijan is a member of:

Asian Development Bank (ADB)
Black Sea Economic Cooperation Zone (BSEC)
Commonwealth of Independent States (CIS)
Council of Europe (CE)
Economic Cooperation Organization (ECO)
Euro-Atlantic Partnership Council (EAPC)
European Bank for Reconstruction and Development (EBRD)
Food and Agriculture Organization (FAO)
General Confederation of Trade Unions (GCTU)
International Atomic Energy Agency (IAEA)
International Bank for Reconstruction and Development (IBRD)
International Civil Aviation Organization (ICAO)
International Criminal Police Organization (Interpol)
International Development Association (IDA)
International Federation of Red Cross and Red Crescent Societies (IFRCS)
International Finance Corporation (IFC)
International Fund for Agricultural Development (IFAD)
International Labour Organization (ILO)
International Maritime Organization (IMO)
International Monetary Fund (IMF)
International Olympic Committee (IOC)
International Organization for Migration (IOM)
International Organization for Standardization (ISO)
International Red Cross and Red Crescent Movement (ICRM)
International Telecommunication Union (ITU)
International Telecommunications Satellite Organization (ITSO)

International Trade Union Confederation (ITUC)
Inter-Parliamentary Union (IPU)
Islamic Development Bank (IDB)
Multilateral Investment Guarantee Agency (MIGA)
Nonaligned Movement (NAM) (observer)
Organisation of Islamic Cooperation (OIC)
Organization for Democracy and Economic Development (GUAM)
Organization for Security and Cooperation in Europe (OSCE)
Organisation for the Prohibition of Chemical Weapons (OPCW)
Organization of American States (OAS) (observer)
Partnership for Peace (PFP)
Southeast European Cooperative Initiative (SECI) (observer)
United Nations (UN)
United Nations Conference on Trade and Development (UNCTAD)
United Nations Educational, Scientific, and Cultural Organization (UNESCO)
United Nations Industrial Development Organization (UNIDO)
Universal Postal Union (UPU)
World Customs Organization (WCO)
World Federation of Trade Unions (WFTU)
World Health Organization (WHO)
World Intellectual Property Organization (WIPO)
World Meteorological Organization (WMO)
World Tourism Organization (UNWTO)
World Trade Organization (WTO) (observer)

Law and order in Azerbaijan 

Law of Azerbaijan
 Capital punishment in Azerbaijan
 Constitution of Azerbaijan
 Crime in Azerbaijan
 Human rights in Azerbaijan
 LGBT rights in Azerbaijan
 Freedom of religion in Azerbaijan
 Law enforcement in Azerbaijan

Military of Azerbaijan 

Azerbaijani Armed Forces
 Command
 Commander-in-chief: President of Azerbaijan
 Ministry of Defence (Azerbaijan)
 Forces
 Azerbaijani Land Forces
 Azerbaijani National Guard
 Azerbaijani Peacekeeping Forces
 Azerbaijani Air and Air Defence Force
 Azerbaijani Navy
Paramilitary agencies
 State Border Service (Azerbaijan)
 Azerbaijani Coast Guard
 Internal Troops of Azerbaijan
 Military history of Azerbaijan
 Military ranks of Azerbaijan

Local government in Azerbaijan 

Local government in Azerbaijan

History of Azerbaijan 

History of Azerbaijan
Timeline of the history of Azerbaijan
Current events of Azerbaijan
 Military history of Azerbaijan

Culture of Azerbaijan 

Culture of Azerbaijan
 Architecture of Azerbaijan
 Cuisine of Azerbaijan
 Ethnic minorities in Azerbaijan
 Festivals in Azerbaijan
 Languages of Azerbaijan
 Media in Azerbaijan
 National symbols of Azerbaijan
 Coat of arms of Azerbaijan
 Flag of Azerbaijan
 National anthem of Azerbaijan
 People of Azerbaijan
 Prostitution in Azerbaijan
 Public holidays in Azerbaijan
 Records of Azerbaijan
 Religion in Azerbaijan
 Christianity in Azerbaijan
 Hinduism in Azerbaijan
 Islam in Azerbaijan
 Judaism in Azerbaijan
 Sikhism in Azerbaijan
 World Heritage Sites in Azerbaijan

Art in Azerbaijan 
Art in Azerbaijan
 Cinema of Azerbaijan
 Literature of Azerbaijan
 Music of Azerbaijan
 Television in Azerbaijan
 Theatre in Azerbaijan

Sport in Azerbaijan 

Sport in Azerbaijan
 Football in Azerbaijan
 Azerbaijan at the Olympics

Economy and infrastructure of Azerbaijan 

Economy of Azerbaijan
 Economic rank, by nominal GDP (2007): 79th (seventy-ninth)
 Agriculture in Azerbaijan
 Banking in Azerbaijan
 National Bank of Azerbaijan
 Communications in Azerbaijan
 Internet in Azerbaijan
 Companies of Azerbaijan
Currency of Azerbaijan: Manat
ISO 4217: AZN
 Energy in Azerbaijan
 Energy in Azerbaijan
 Energy policy of Azerbaijan
 Oil industry in Azerbaijan
 Health care in Azerbaijan
 Mining in Azerbaijan
 Azerbaijan Stock Exchange
 Tourism in Azerbaijan
 Visa policy of Azerbaijan
 Transport in Azerbaijan
 Airports in Azerbaijan
 Rail transport in Azerbaijan
 Roads in Azerbaijan

Education in Azerbaijan 

Education in Azerbaijan
 Ministry of Education of Azerbaijan
 Primary education
 Required: Education through the eighth grade is compulsory.
 Higher education
 Total enrollment: 105,000+ (2009)
 Faculty:
 11,566 professors 
 12,616 other faculty members
Universities in Azerbaijan
 Total: 51
 36 state-run universities
 15 private universities
 List of universities in Baku
 Libraries
 National Library of Azerbaijan

See also 

Azerbaijan

Index of Azerbaijan-related articles
List of international rankings
Member states of the United Nations
Outline of geography
Outline of Asia
Outline of Nagorno-Karabakh

References

External links 

 State Statistical Committee of Azerbaijan
 Azerbaijan. The World Factbook. Central Intelligence Agency.

Azerbaijan
Azerbaijan